A gas van or gas wagon (dushegubka, literally "soul killer") was a truck reequipped as a mobile gas chamber. During the World War II Holocaust, Nazi Germany developed and used gas vans on a large scale as an extermination method to murder inmates of asylums, Poles, Romani people, Jews, and prisoners in occupied Poland, Belarus, Yugoslavia, the Soviet Union, and other regions of German-occupied Europe. One case of usage of gas van by Soviet NKVD during the Great Purge was documented.

Nazi Germany
The use of gas vans by the Germans to murder Jews, Poles, Romani people, mentally ill people, and prisoners in occupied territories during World War II originated with the Nazi Euthanasia Program in 1939. Ordered to find a suitable method of killing, the Technical Institute for the Detection of Crime ("Kriminaltechnisches Institut der Sicherheitspolizei", abbreviated KTI) of the Reichssicherheitshauptamt (RSHA) decided to gas victims with Carbon monoxide. In October 1939 the Nazis started gassing prisoners in Fort VII near Posen. The first victims were Polish and Jewish inmates of asylums for the mentally ill. Witnesses report that from December 1939, mobile gas chambers were used to murder the inmates of asylums in Pomerania, Eastern Prussia and Poland. The vans were built for the Sonderkommando Lange and their use was supposed to speed up the killings. Instead of transporting the victims to the gas chambers, the gas chambers were transported to the victims. They were most likely devised by specialists from the Referat II D of the RSHA. These mobile gas chambers worked under the same principles as the stationary gas chambers: through a rubber hose the driver released pure CO from steel cylinders into the air tight special construction that was shaped like a box and placed on the carrier. The vans resembled moving vans or delivery lorries and they were labelled Kaiser's Kaffee Geschäft (de) ("Kaiser's Coffee Shop") for camouflage. They were not called "gas vans" at the time, but "Sonder-Wagen", "Spezialwagen" (special vans) and "Entlausungswagen" (delousing vans). The Lange commando killed patients in numerous hospitals in the Wartheland in 1940. They drove to the hospitals, collected patients, loaded them into the vans and gassed them while they were driving them away. From 21 May to 8 June 1940 the Sonderkommando Lange murdered 1558 sick people from Soldau concentration camp.

In August 1941, SS chief Heinrich Himmler attended a demonstration of a mass-shooting of Jews in Minsk that was arranged by Arthur Nebe, after which he vomited. Regaining his composure, Himmler decided that alternative murder techniques should be found. He ordered Nebe to explore more "convenient" ways of killing that were less stressful for the killers. Nebe decided to conduct his experiments by murdering Soviet mental patients, first with explosives near Minsk, and then with automobile exhaust at Mogilev. Nebe's experiments led to the development of the gas van. This vehicle had already been used in 1940 for the gassing of East Prussian and Pomeranian mental patients in the Soldau concentration camp.

Gas vans were used, particularly at the Chełmno extermination camp, until gas chambers were developed as a more efficient method for murdering large numbers of people. Two types of gas vans were used by the Einsatzgruppen in the East. The Opel-Blitz, which weighed 3.5 tons, and the larger Saurerwagen, which weighed 7 tons. In Belgrade, the gas van was known as "Dušegupka" and in the occupied parts of the USSR similarly as "душегубка" (dushegubka, literally "soul killer" or "exterminator"). The SS used the euphemisms Sonderwagen, Spezialwagen or S-wagen ("special vehicle") for the vans. The gas vans were specifically designed to direct deadly exhaust fumes via metal pipes into the airtight cargo compartments, where the intended victims had been forcibly stuffed to capacity. In most cases the victims were suffocated and poisoned from carbon monoxide and other toxins in the exhaust as the vans were transporting them to fresh pits or ravines for mass burial.

The use of gas vans had two disadvantages:
It was slowsome victims took twenty minutes to die.
It was not quietthe drivers could hear the victims' screams, which they found distracting and disturbing.

By June 1942 the main producer of gas vans, Gaubschat Fahrzeugwerke GmbH, had delivered 20 gas vans in two models (for 30–50 and 70–100 individuals) to Einsatzgruppen, out of 30 that were ordered from that company. Not one gas van was extant at the end of the war. The existence of gas vans first came to light in 1943 during the trial of Nazi collaborators who had been involved in the murder of civilians in Krasnodar. A group of 30 to 60 civilians were gassed on August 21 and 22, 1942 by members of Sonderkommando (special unit) 10a of Einsatzgruppe D, who were supported by local collaborators. Subsequently, gas vans were used for murder of Roma people and ill persons. The total number of gas van killings is unknown.

The gas vans are extensively discussed in some of the interviews in Claude Lanzmann's film Shoah.

Soviet Union
During the Great Purge in the Soviet Union, NKVD officer Isaj D. Berg used a specially adapted airtight van for gassing prisoners to death on an experimental basis. The prisoners were gassed on the way to Butovo, a phony firing range, where the NKVD executed its prisoners and buried them. According to testimony given by NKVD officer Nikolai Kharitonov in 1956, Isaj Berg had been instrumental in the production of gas vans. Berg had become chief of the administrative economic department in Moscow’s NKVD in the summer of 1937. In October 1937 he was charged with the supervision of the Butovo firing range. Berg had to prepare Butovo for the mass execution of people from greater Moscow and to ensure that these executions would take place smoothly. According to testimony given by Fjodor Tschesnokov, a member of Berg’s execution team, in 1956, trucks were used, which were equipped with valves through which the gas could be directed inside the vehicles. The interrogations revealed that the prisoners were stripped naked, tied up, gagged and thrown into the trucks. Their property was stolen. Berg was arrested on 3 August 1938 and sentenced to death for participating in a "counter-revolutionary conspiracy within the NKVD" and executed on 3 March 1939.

The scale at which these trucks were used is unknown. Author Tomas Kizny assumes that they were in use while Berg oversaw the executions (October 1937 to 4 August 1938). He points to archaeological excavations conducted in 1997. Then 59 corpses were exhumed who most likely had been murdered during Berg's tenure. Only four of these victims had been shot in the head, which leads Kizny to conclude that at least some of them had been gassed.

Controversy over the invention of the gas van
Historians of the Holocaust like Henry Friedlander argue that the mobile gas chambers were invented in Germany in 1940, and they were first used to murder patients of Wartheland hospitals. Katrin Reichelt names Albert Widmann and Arthur Nebe as having developed the method by which human beings were murdered in vans by exhaust fumes. The vans themselves were modified by Walter Rauff, Friedrich Pradel and Harry Wentritt. Matthias Beer calls gas vans "a special product of the Third Reich". 

Robert Gellately points out that during a euthanasia program in occupied Poland the Nazi killers sought a more efficient and secretive killing process and thus "invented the first gas van, which began operations in the Warthegau on January 15, 1940, under Herbert Lange". He also notes, that "the Soviets sometimes used a gas van (dushegubka), as in Moscow during the 1930s, but how extensive that was needs further investigation. They used crematoriums to dispose of thousands of bodies, but had no gas chambers." 

Journalist Yevgenia Albats maintains that gas vans were a "Soviet invention". Kizny names Berg as the "inventor".

See also

Execution van
Walter Rauff
August Becker
The Holocaust
Nazi crimes against the Polish nation
Operation Reinhard
Charcoal-burning suicide

Bibliography

References

External links

The Development of the Gas-Van from the Jewish Virtual Library
Film: Short explanation about the Gas vans at the Nuremberg trials (United States Holocaust Memorial Museum )
NAZI GAS VANS By Rob Arndt 

Infrastructure of the Holocaust
Execution equipment
Einsatzgruppen
Vans

de:Gaskammer (Massenmord)#Gaswagen